Vlad Goian (born 14 November 1970) is a football manager and former player who last time was manager of FC Zimbru Chișinău in 2022.

Career

Managerial
Between 2011 and 2014, Vlad Goian worked as manager of FC Tiraspol, winning two times Moldovan Cup with his team.

On 16 September 2019, Goian was appointed manager of FC Yerevan on a one-year contract, but was replaced by António Caldas as manager on 4 October of the same year.

He holds an UEFA PRO Manager Licence.

Zimbru Chișinău
On 10 June 2020, Goian was announced as the new head coach of Zimbru Chișinău.

On 16 October 2020, he left his position as head coach to become technical director of the academy of the same club.

On 17 February 2021, he returned as head coach of the club. In November 2021 he has been replaced in post by the Italian manager Michele Bon, being assistant manager under Michele Bon. After Bon was fired in June 2022, Goian returned as head coach of the club until 30 August 2022, when resigned.

Honours

Club
FC Iskra-Stali Rîbnița
Moldovan National Division
Runner-up (1): 2009–10
Third place (1): 2008–09

FC Tiraspol
Moldovan National Division
Third place (1): 2012–13
Moldovan Cup (2): 2010–11, 2012–13
Moldovan Super Cup
Runner-up (1): 2013

Individual
Coach of the year in Moldova (3): 2008, 2010, 2012

References

External links
 
 
 

1970 births
Living people
Footballers from Chișinău
Moldovan footballers
Association football defenders
Association football midfielders
FC Zimbru Chișinău players
CSF Bălți players
FC Nistru Otaci players
Speranța Nisporeni players
FC Agro-Goliador Chișinău players
Moldovan Super Liga players
Moldovan football managers
FC Tiraspol managers
FC Saxan managers
FC Academia Chișinău managers
CSF Bălți managers
FC Yerevan managers
FC Zimbru Chișinău managers
Moldovan Super Liga managers
Armenian Premier League managers
Moldovan expatriate football managers
Expatriate football managers in Armenia
Moldovan expatriate sportspeople in Armenia